The following is an incomplete list of paintings by Pieter de Hooch that are generally accepted as autograph by Peter C. Sutton and other sources. The list is more or less in order of creation, starting from around 1648 when Pieter de Hooch began painting on his own in Delft. Later he moved to Amsterdam and his interiors seem somewhat grander in style. Most of his works are genre scenes involving daily life, but he also made at least one religious allegory.

Sources
 A Catalogue Raisonné of the Works of the Most Eminent Dutch Painters of the Seventeenth century Based on the work of John Smith, Volume I (Jan Steen, Gabriel Metsu, Gerard Dou, Pieter de Hooch, Carel Fabritius, Johannes Vermeer of Delft), by Cornelis Hofstede de Groot, with the assistance of Wilhelm Reinhold Valentiner, translated by Edward G. Hawke, Macmillan & Co., London, 1908
 Pieter de Hooch:Complete Edition, by Peter C. Sutton, Phaidon Press, Oxford, 1980, 
 Pieter de Hooch in the RKD

Hooch
 List